Beyond the Black is a German symphonic metal band formed in 2014 in Mannheim. Their debut album Songs of Love and Death became popular immediately after the release, and entered the German and Austrian national music charts.

History 
The band was formed in 2014 in Mannheim, Germany by Jennifer Haben (vocalist, ex-Saphir). After finishing the production of Beyond the Black's first album together with her producers, Haben engaged Nils Lesser (lead guitar), Christopher Hummels (rhythm guitar/backing vocals), Michael Hauser (keyboards), Erwin Schmidt (bass) and Tobias Derer (drums) as live musicians. They made their first appearances at the Wacken Open Air 2014 festival and on tour supporting Saxon and Hell.

On 13 February 2015, Beyond the Black released their debut full-length album Songs of Love and Death, which reached the 12th place in the German music charts and 21st place in the Austrian charts. The album was produced by Sascha Paeth (Avantasia) and received mostly positive reviews from critics. A week later, on February 20, the band appeared on the German Sat.1 Breakfast television with the song "In the Shadows".

From 13 May 2015, the band embarked on its first tour through Germany, including an appearance at the Wave-Gotik-Treffen on May 23, 2015 and several more festivals in Germany, Austria and Switzerland.

Beyond the Black's second album, titled Lost in Forever, was released on the 12 February 2016 and features 13 tracks. The deluxe edition features 9 live songs (including an unreleased cover), an interview and an interactive menu.

On July 15, 2016, the band announced that Jennifer Haben and her musicians were parting ways. Haben continued the band with new members. The new band line-up (Kai Tschierschky (drums), Tobi Lodes (rhythm guitar), Chris Hermsdörfer (lead guitar), Stefan Herkenhoff (bass) and Jonas Roßner (keyboards)) was announced in November 2016 and organized as a permanent-member band from this time on.

On January 13, 2017, the band's second album Lost In Forever was released as a Tour Edition with additional song material. Beyond the Black started touring internationally then with shows in the UK, Czech Republic, Poland, Russia and Japan. In 2017 the band also toured as a support act for Aerosmith and Scorpions.

In spring 2018, keyboardist Jonas Roßner left Beyond the Black for private reasons. On August 31, 2018, their third album Heart of the Hurricane was released, followed by an extensive European tour as support for the Dutch symphonic metal band Within Temptation till the end of the year.

In 2019, the band released a Black Edition of their album Heart of the Hurricane with three new songs and went on a European headline tour, which has mainly sold out.

On June 19, 2020, Beyond the Black released their fourth album Hørizøns, reaching the bands highest chart positions to date. In the course of the release, the band announced a European co-headline tour together with the Swedish/Danish metal band Amaranthe.

In July 2022 they took part in the 4 days rock fest "Midalidare - Rock in the Wine Valley", on the evening of Within Temptation.

On September 9, 2022, Amaranthe released an alternate single version (including a lyric video) of their song "Make It Better", with Haben as a guest singer.

Members 

Current members
 Jennifer Haben – lead vocals, piano, acoustic guitar (2014–present)
 Chris Hermsdörfer – lead guitar, backing vocals (2016–present)
 Tobi Lodes – rhythm guitar, backing vocals (2016–present)
 Kai Tschierschky – drums (2016–present)

Current live members
 Linus Klausenitzer – bass, backing vocals (2021–present)

Former members
 Nils Lesser – lead guitar (2014–2016)
 Christopher Hummels – rhythm guitar, backing vocals (2014–2016)
 Tobias Derer – drums (2014–2016)
 Erwin Schmidt – bass (2014–2016)
 Michael Hauser – keyboards (2014–2016)
 Jonas Roßner – keyboards, backing vocals (2016–2018)
 Stefan Herkenhoff – bass, backing vocals (2016–2021)

Timeline

Discography

Albums

EPs

Singles 

Promo singles

Music videos 
 "In the Shadows" (2015)
 "Lost in Forever" (2016)
 "Night Will Fade" (2017)
 "Forget My Name (2017 Version)" (2017)
 "Heart of the Hurricane" (2018)
 "Million Lightyears" (2018)
 "Breeze" (2018)
 "Through the Mirror" (2019)
 "Misery"  (2020) 
 "Human" (2020) 
 "Reincarnation" (2022) 
 "Dancing In The Dark" (2022) 
 "Free me" (2023)

Promotional videos 
 "Songs of Love and Death" (2015)
 "Love Me Forever" (2015)
 "Written In Blood" (2016)

References

External links 

 
 

2014 establishments in Germany
German symphonic metal musical groups
Musical groups established in 2014
Musical groups from Baden-Württemberg
Musical quintets
Female-fronted musical groups
Napalm Records artists
Nuclear Blast artists